Qidu is a railway station in Keelung, Taiwan served by the Taiwan Railways Administration.

History
The station was opened in 1891, during Qing rule. It serves the area of Qidu. In Japanese rule, the station name was pronounced as Shichito in Japanese, then romanisation as Chitu after WWII until 2003. It is now the origin station for most of the southbound trains on the West Coast line, after the new station was completed in 2007.

Around the station
 National Keelung Commercial & Industrial Vocational Senior High School (next to the station)
 Yang Ming Marine Transport Corporation headquarter office (300m to the west)
 Qidu Night Market (350m to the northeast)
 Qidu Railway Memorial Park (400m to the northeast)

See also
 List of railway stations in Taiwan

References

External links

TRA Qidu Station
Taiwan Railways Administration

1891 establishments in Taiwan
Railway stations in Keelung
Railway stations opened in 1891
Railway stations served by Taiwan Railways Administration